is an unreleased Japanese fan film project directed and produced by Shizuo Nakajima. The film stars Ema Ishihara and Shitosi Shima.

Production
Filmmaker Shizuo Nakajima conceived the idea for the film during his employment with Toho as a production assistant. He envisioned it as a feature-length film with human drama and location shots and as a love-letter to Eiji Tsuburaya's works, however, Nakajima also drew inspiration from Hammer's The Curse of the Werewolf. The team purchased materials directly from Toho and built miniature industrial factories, buildings, and full monster suits. Using former Toho employees, principal photography began in 1983 and wrapped in the mid-80s, with 10 hours of raw footage completed. The film was shot on 8mm film. Post-production has been active since the mid-80s and is currently continuing on the film.

Release
The film has remained unreleased due to litigation from Toho (owners of Godzilla) for the unauthorized use of Godzilla. Despite this, some of the footage was release on YouTube.

References

External links
 
Full Movie (archived)

Fan films based on Godzilla
Unofficial adaptations
Werewolf films
Fan films
Unreleased films